Marvin E. Aspen (born July 11, 1934) is a senior United States district judge of the United States District Court for the Northern District of Illinois.

Education and career

Born in Chicago, Illinois, Aspen received a Bachelor of Science degree from Northwestern University in 1956 and a Juris Doctor from Northwestern University Pritzker School of Law in 1958. He was a law clerk in the Court of Claims Section of the United States Department of Justice in Washington, D.C. in 1958. He was in the Illinois National Guard from 1958 to 1960, and was an Air Force Reserve Command Airman from 1960 to 1964. He was also in private practice as an attorney in Chicago from 1958 to 1959, and in 1971, serving in the interim as an assistant state attorney of Cook County, Illinois from 1960 to 1963, and as an assistant corporation counsel for the City of Chicago's Head of Appeals and Review Division, from 1963 to 1971. He has been an adjunct professor of law at Northwestern University since 1969. He was a judge of the Circuit Court of Cook County, Illinois from 1971 to 1979.

Federal judicial service

On April 30, 1979, Aspen was nominated by President Jimmy Carter to a new seat on the United States District Court for the Northern District of Illinois created by 92 Stat. 1629. He was confirmed by the United States Senate on July 23, 1979, and received his commission on July 24, 1979. He served as Chief Judge from 1995 to 2002, assuming senior status on July 1, 2002.

Other Highlights
In 1984, he was the presiding judge for a trial involving the singer Michael Jackson, where the King of Pop successfully defended himself against an accusation of copyright infringement for the song "The Girl Is Mine."

See also
 List of Jewish American jurists

References

External links
 

1934 births
Living people
Northwestern University Pritzker School of Law alumni
Illinois state court judges
Judges of the United States District Court for the Northern District of Illinois
United States district court judges appointed by Jimmy Carter
20th-century American judges
United States Air Force airmen
United States Air Force reservists
Northwestern University Pritzker School of Law faculty
21st-century American judges